Chester is a historic home located near Homeville, Sussex County, Virginia.  It was built in 1773, and is a two-story, three bay, frame dwelling with side gable roof.  It features two exterior chimney stacks, joined on both the first and second floor levels by pent closets.  Attached to the main section is a two-story wing with an exterior chimney and a shallow gable roof added in the 1820s.

It was listed on the National Register of Historic Places in 1970.

References

Houses on the National Register of Historic Places in Virginia
Houses completed in 1773
National Register of Historic Places in Sussex County, Virginia
Houses in Sussex County, Virginia